Rudno is a village in the Municipality of Železniki in the Upper Carniola region of Slovenia.

References

External links

Rudno at Geopedia

Populated places in the Municipality of Železniki